Deuce Bigalow is a fictional character played by Rob Schneider in the following movies:

Deuce Bigalow: Male Gigolo (1999)
Deuce Bigalow: European Gigolo (2005)

See also
 Bigelow (disambiguation)

Fictional male prostitutes